Chatellerault machine gun refers to a machine gun designed by the Manufacture d'armes de Châtellerault, such as:

 FM 24/29 light machine gun for infantry
 Reibel machine gun in tanks
 MAC 1934 aboard aircraft